Queenscliff is a small town on the Bellarine Peninsula in southern Victoria, Australia, south of Swan Bay at the entrance to Port Phillip. It is the administrative centre for the Borough of Queenscliffe.

Queenscliff is a seaside resort now known for its Victorian era heritage and tourist industry and as one of the endpoints of the Searoad ferry to Sorrento on the Mornington Peninsula.

History
Prior to European settlement, it was inhabited by the Bengalat Bulag clan of the Wautharong tribe, members of the Kulin nation.

European explorers first arrived in 1802, Lieutenant John Murray in January and Captain Matthew Flinders in April. The first European settler in the area was convict escapee William Buckley between 1803 and 1835, who briefly lived in a cave with local Aborigines at Point Lonsdale, above which the lighthouse was later built.

Permanent European settlement began in 1836 when squatters arrived.  Shortland's Bluff was named in honour of Lieutenant John Shortland, who assisted in the surveying of Port Phillip. Land sales began in 1853, the same year the name was changed to Queenscliff by Lieutenant Charles La Trobe, in honour of Queen Victoria.

The Post Office opened on 1 May 1853 as Shortland's Bluff and was renamed Queenscliff in 1854.

Originally a fishing village, Queenscliff soon became an important cargo port, servicing steamships trading in Port Philip. A shipping pilot service was established in 1841 to lead boats through the treacherous Rip, and its two lighthouses, the High and Low Lights, were constructed in 1862–63.  Queenscliff also played an important military role. Fort Queenscliff was built between 1879 and 1889, and operated as the command centre for a network of forts around the port.

1880s seaside resort boom

Queenscliff became a tourist destination in the late 19th century, visitors arriving from Melbourne after a two-hour journey on the paddle steamer, Ozone. 
The opening of a railway line to Geelong in 1879 brought more tourists to the area, and numerous luxury hotels (or coffee palaces) were built to accommodate them. The Palace Hotel (later renamed Esplanade Hotel, now known as the Queenscliff Brewhouse) was built in 1879, the Baillieu Hotel was built in 1881 (and later renamed Ozone Hotel), the Vue Grande Hotel in 1883, and the Queenscliff Hotel in 1887.

Decline
The advent of the car saw Queenscliff drop in popularity as a tourist destination, as tourists were no longer dependent on its role as a transport hub. The railway ceased weekly passenger services in 1950, and was closed in 1976. In 1979 the Queenscliff Railway reopened as a Heritage Train Service, running between Queenscliff and Drysdale stations with mid-point stops at Laker's Siding and Suma Park.

Revival
The 1980s saw a return in the town's tourist popularity.

In 2005, the area previously holding the Fort Barracks was subdivided into residential blocks and renamed Shortlands Beach in honour of the town's prior name. The proposed redevelopment drew fierce criticism from some sectors of the community, who feared loss of an important heritage site. The original fort remains on site.

Heritage listed sites

Queenscliff contains several Victorian Heritage Register listed sites, including:

 1 Weeroona Parade and 2 Wharf Street, Fisherman's Shed
 44 Gellibrand Street, Lathamstowe
 42 Gellibrand Street, Ozone Hotel
 60-62 Gellibrand Street, Pilots Cottages
 16 Gellibrand Street, Queenscliff Hotel
 Symonds Street, Queenscliff Pier and Lifeboat Complex
 20 Symonds Street, Queenscliff railway station
 26 King Street, Rosenfeld
 42 Mercer Street, Roseville Cottage
 16-26 Hobson Street, St George the Martyr Church and Parish Hall
 80 Mercer Street, Warringah
 Corner Wharf Street and Gellibrand Street, Wreck Bell

Arts and culture

Festivals
The Queenscliff Seafood Feast, a culinary festival using fresh seafood donated by local fishermen, is held annually on Good Friday to raise funds for the Royal Children's Hospital.

Queenscliff is also home to the Queenscliff Music Festival, a popular annual music festival, held on the last weekend of November, which attracts both local and international acts and is an important part of the town's tourist industry.

Museums
Queenscliff has three museums; the Queenscliff Historical Museum, Queenscliff Maritime Museum, and the Fort Queenscliff Museum.

Sport
The Queenscliff Football Club is the town's Australian rules football club which participates in the Bellarine Football League.

Golfers play at the course of the Queenscliff Golf Club at Swan Island.

Media
The Queenscliff Herald was founded in 1999 by Greg Wane who edited and managed the newspaper until 2004 when the Murphy family bought the masthead and continue to publish the newspaper.
The final elimination on the second season of The Mole took place here in late 2000.

Tourist Attractions 
As a popular tourist destination, Queenscliff has numerous tourist attractions including The Bellarine Railway, the Marine and Freshwater Discovery Centre and Queenscliff Harbour. The town is also famous for ghosts including Big Rem.

Transport

As it is located on a peninsula, the Bellarine Highway is the only road connecting it to Point Lonsdale and Geelong running west.

Searoad Ferries provides transport from Queenscliff to Sorrento on the Mornington Peninsula.

It was once connected by railway to Geelong; however, the Bellarine Railway now runs as a tourist railway only to Drysdale. The Bellarine Rail Trail is a 32 km walking and cycling track that follows the route of the former rail line.

References

External links

 Queenscliffe Historical Museum Website
 Queenscliffe Historical Museum
 Queenscliffe Maritime Museum
 Queensclliff - Tourism Victoria
 Fort Queenscliff Museum
 Saint George The Martyr Church Queenscliff
 Queenscliff Visitor Guide
 Point Lonsdale Visitor Guide

Towns in Victoria (Australia)
Towns in Barwon (region)
Borough of Queenscliffe
Bellarine Peninsula
Coastal towns in Victoria (Australia)
Seaside resorts in Australia
Port Phillip
1836 establishments in Australia
Ports and harbours of Victoria (Australia)
Fishing communities in Australia